Qaleh Sangi (also Romanized as Qal‘eh Sangī) is a village in Simakan Rural District, in the Central District of Bavanat County, Fars Province, Iran. At the 2006 census, its population was 124, in 30 families.

References 

Populated places in Bavanat County